Mirusha is a regional park located in the central part of Kosovo on the eastern side of the Dukagjin plain.

The area has been put under protection in 1975 as a special nature reserve, with an area of 190.21.55 ha by a decision of municipality of Rahovec and Klina.

Due to its geoheritage values, specific landscapes, as well as high plant diversity, in 1982 it was declared a regional park in the fifth category (Protected Landscape) according to IUCN, with an area of 555.80.70 ha, stretching on three municipalities: Klina, Malisheva and Rahovec.

One year later in 1983 due hydrological, geo-morphological and landscape values, the water flow of river Mirusha has also been put under protection in third category (Natural Monument) according to IUCN. Its area consist of 11.97,29 ha and belongs to Rahovec and Klina municipalities.

Features 

Mirusha Park is known for its canyon in which flows the Mirusha River that creates series of karst lakes and waterfalls arranged one after another in cascades. Due to its geological structure which consists of ultra basic rocks and volcanic-sedimentary formations (diabase chert) of Jurassic age and the carbonates from the lower and upper Cretaceous, Mirusha river has created a 200 meters deep canyon.

At certain points along the canyon lie small lakes, connected to each other by waterfalls, high up to 21 m. There are located in total 12 waterfalls and 16 lakes. They vary in shape and size according to their position, and the structure and lithological composition of the limestone blocks. The canyon is at its widest at the final lake, while the narrowest part is in the area of the fourth lake, where it is also deepest, between cliffs 200 m high.

Rare natural geological and geomorphological features, also create interesting motives for the landscape of the park, especially specific geological form of the terrain, caves, cracks, other rocky phenomena which are created as a result of geological past, the effects of erosion, water and other exogenous factors.

As a result of mild continental climate influenced by the Mediterranean, a very rich flora and fauna has been created. The regional park area is home to many endemic and stenoendemic species.

Location 

Mirusha Park is one of the most beautiful and most interesting areas of nature in Kosovo, which lies in the central part of the country, in the territory of the municipalities of Klina, Malisheva and Orahovac.

The nature park is located in the south of the Gremnik mountains, on both sides of Mirusha River, from the beginning of canyon up to the discharge in the White Drin River, around 2 km from villages of Dush, Grapc and Llapqeva and the Hill of Dushi.

In the western part of the park passes the national road Klina - Gjakova (M9.1). Parallel to this road lies the railway Peja -Prizren. Around 8 km to the north passes the national road Pristina - Peja.
Distance from the capital of Kosovo - Pristina is 65 km.

Geography 

The nature regional park of Mirusha covers  throughout Klina, Malisheva and Rahovec municipalities on the eastern side of the Dukagjini plain, central Kosovo.
The geodiversity of the Mirusha river basin represents important heritage components linked to geology, geomorphology and hydrology, important for science, education as well as for touristic use.

Geology

The geological structure of the park consists of ultra basic rocks and volcanic-sedimentary formations (diabase chert) of Jurassic Era and the carbonates from the lower and upper Cretaceous. The geological structure of Mirusha canyon mainly compose Mesozoic limestone cliffs with tendency to drop in the direction of the water flow. Extension of these rocks in the direction northwest–southeast, and dropping to the southeast, presents geological extension of rocks.

Quaternary sediments are represented by humus, sand humus, clay humus and alevrol. River terraces of Mirusha  valley are mainly constructed from pieces of rounded quartzite, Palaeozoic Slate, Cretaceous limestone, sandstone, serpentinite, diabase and Gabrovo. These fluvial terraces are of diluvial origin.

Alluvium is common on both sides of the river Mirusha. In general, there is not a wide spread in the area of Alluvium.

Deluvionet are more common in the wide part of region. These sediments are formed under natural conditions passing through sedimentary material, from mobile state or transferred to the stationary state. Quaternary sediments are in contact with upper Cretaceous limestone. Also, in the eastern and western part these sediments are in contact with metasediment belt. Quaternary area is represented by lake sediments, su-clay, gravel, sand and silt.

Pliocene sediments also stretch within the park area. In most part they are in erosion contact with upper Cretaceous limestone cliffs. These limestones are massive and contain numerous traces of gastropods and lay through Senon limestone floor.
Also in the Pliocene sediments are confirmed several layers of coal appearance.

Lower Cretaceous is represented by limestone plaque of different colors and is more common in the western part.

Sedimentary volcanogenic series spread out in the south-western region. According to geological map there are two areas of widespread: the northern and southern areas. In the Northern area, spread flysch, conglomeratic sand and marly formations while in south area, spread shale clay, sandstone and siliceous.

The area has large geoheritage value and a great potential for tourism. The most important geoheritage values are the canyon itself with lakes, waterfalls, caves, (Dushi cave, Ponorci cave, Zatriqi cave, cave of Azem Galica, etc.), karst forms,  (ponds, scribes, karsts valleys, etc.) as well as decorative stones, bauxite, fossils, thermal spring water and a very characteristic appearance of the rocks. These values are important for science, education as well as for touristic use.

Caves 

In Mirusha canyon are created special relief forms: deepening, caves, rocky cuts, material deposits, lakes, etc. Besides the waterfalls and lakes characteristic forms are also caves with different shapes and sizes. Some of the most interesting caves are the Great Church and Small Church caves, the cave in the tenth lake, the cave in the ninth lake which is divided into two channels (the left and right channel), the cave behind the ninth lake and the cave of Dush, etc.

Great Church Cave stretches at the last lake on the right side of river flow. This cave is located in a characteristic relief in the wall form. The cave, in its geological past, has been a source of underground waters. It has a 4 m wide and 12 m high entrance and has a total length of 40 m. At the end of the cave there are few stalactites and stalagmites and karst pillars.

Small Church Cave has small size with a length of 4 m. The entrance of the cave is 1.4 m wide which from the bottom narrows further. The end of the cave is horizontal and filled with mud. From the entrance to the Great Church cave, the channel goes in the southeast direction where after 4 m a limestone rock appear in various forms and with cuts, through which is possible to gain access to the cave of the small church.

The cave in the tenth lake stretches under the waterfall with a width 9 m, 16 m length and 3 m water depth,
it depends on the level of the lake. The entrance of the cave is 5 m wide and 3 m high. The karst cave is formed by the erosive forces of the water of Mirusha river.

The cave in the ninth lake consists of two channels: the right and the left one. The entrance to this cave is
possible only by passing under the waters of ninth lake. Left channel has an entrance of arch shape with a width of 3 m and a height of 6 m and its 43 m long. Right channel has arc entrance  6 m wide and 7 m high.

Karst caves – in the early geological past these caves have been underground water resources in river Mirusha.

The Great cave is situated along ninth lake. Entering to the cave is achieved only by passing under the water of Mirusha channel. The cave is still under the influence of river erosion. In the entire length of the cave (44 m) its bottom is filled with 5–6 m water. The entrance has a width up to 9 m, and a height of 5 m. The cave is formed at the end of the valley of the Dush village which ranges from North to South towards the canyon. The cave can be reached via the Dush -Ponorc road near the beginning of the canyon.

The Dushi cave is the most interesting and most important regarding the natural values in the whole region of Mirusha Park. The passable length of the cave is 180 m. It should be mentioned also that the cave has two secondary channels of 40 m, so with secondary channels the total length of cave is 260 m. The entrance of the cave is quite impressive with a width of 10 m and a height of 15 m. Inside the cave up to the 72nd meter, in the northern direction extends the channel with about 40 m length, while in the south-east direction the cave is passable through the meandrin canal up to 180th meter. In the 180th meter, the secondary channel connects with the main channel of the cave and the other secondary channel towards the south-west. Here the cave also ends in the form of „S“ and is not passable. Inside the cave there are six small lakes created during the erosive activity and waterfalls up to 2–5 m high. It is rich in stalactites, stalagmites and columns of different shapes and sizes, with large numbers of bats living inside (Rhinolophus ferrumequinum, Rh. blasii, Eptesicus serotinus).

Hydrology 

In Mirusha park flows the river Mirusha, from which the park took its name. Due to hydrological, geomorphologic and landscape importance this river has been put under protection in 1983 in third category according to IUCN.

The source of the River Mirusha is situated in the west of the Caraleva mountains. It forms the left branch of the White Drin river with a length 37 km with an average altitude of 795–360 m above sea level. The average flow of Mirusha river is 1.2 m³/s while the average water level of the river is 0.65 cm. The river covers an area of 336.7 km2, around 3.1% of the total land area of Kosovo.

Mirusha River hydrographic network is generally asymmetric irrespective of numerous leaks streams and creeks to the right of the river Mirusha, in front with those of the left.

The main branches of Mirusha River are: the river of Biniqëve, "Lugu i Perrockës", "Lugu i Malishevës", Stopanica, the river of Bubavec and the stream of Kijevo. Most streams, even those who have large catchment area, for each year in the dry season of the year they dry in the lower parts of the territory, such as: The stream of Kijevo, the brook of Drenoc and the river of Bubavec.

Most of the area that includes the park is built from the source of limestone rock which belongs to the porous cracks formations, where the rocks are with small flow of underground water. Underground waters in general are not common in the area but are assumed to be in the depths of limestone and ultrabasic rocks.

At the end of the canyon, after the last lake on the right side near cliffs is a source of karst water and 30 m away is also a source of water that has water all year long.

Lakes and waterfalls 

The most important and most interesting features of this Mirusha natural phenomenon, are lakes and waterfalls.
These natural phenomena are created in the middle and end course of Mirusha river with a length of 650 m. In this area are situated 16 lakes and 12 waterfalls of different forms and sizes.

The last lake is the largest regarding dimensions and is easily accessible to every visitor. It has dimensions of 55 x 45 m, a depth over 5 m with an area of 2250 m2.
The deepest lake is the 10th lake with a 9 m depth, while the longest lake is the eighth lake with a length of 56 m, width of 18.5 and depth of 5–6 m.

The highest waterfall is between the eighth and ninth lake with a height of 21 m but the most impressive waterfall is between the 15th and 16th lake with a height of 8 m.

Based on the shape and size of these lakes, they are divided into three groups:
 The upper lakes 1–8
 The medium lakes 9–12 and
 The lower lakes 13–16

The upper lakes in terms of the shape and size are usually small, at the beginning with small depth 1–3 m, while in the eighth lake reaches up to 6.5 m. Waters of the lakes move from one lake to another through straits, thresholds and deepening that have created waterfalls of different heights. It is characteristic of the upper lakes, the trend of deepening due to the free fall of water and erosion that cause these drops of water. the width of the upper canyon is small from the first lake where the water begins to create waterfalls and lakes in 0.50–1 m river width which up to the last lake (the eighth) reaches maximum width of 3 m. Another interesting feature is the sound of waterfalls because this part of the canyon is very narrow.

The medium lakes are created in a short geological period and due to their composition,
erosion has been very powerful and has created various forms especially those called walls orris. The absolute height is about 100 m from the 13th lake up to the 8th lake. The terrain is very inconvenient to visit because of the depth and craggy shapes between the lakes. The depths between 9th and 10th waterfall are 6–9 m while the height of wall-shaped waterfall between the eighth and ninth lake is 21 m and between ninth and tenth lake is 9 m.

The lower lakes of the canyon are characterized by different width 50–60 m between the two sides. The natural beauties the lower Mirusha canyon are easier accessible for visitors and are known for the size and depth of the lakes as well as scenic waterfalls. The largest lakes in the entire canyon are the 13th and the 16th (last) lake with a depth of 5 to 7 m. After the 13th lake the waterfall has a height of three meters with a very quick drop of the water that falls into the 14th lake, creating a 14 meters high waterfall toward the 15th lake. At the 15th lake with a similar height the water falls in the 16th lake where Mirusha canyon ends. The dimensions of the lakes vary from the first up to the 16th, depending on the amount of the water and rainfalls in the catchment of Mirusha.

Another characteristic of Mirusha Canyon is also the river erosion where during the process of the water flow, depending on the composition of the rocks, erodes, dissolves and carries erosive material.

Climate 

The climate in the area of Mirusha Park is mild continental influenced by the Mediterranean climate. The area of the Park doesn't have meteorological station but were used climate data from surrounding stations, such as Rahovec (14 km airline), Gjakova (20 km) and Peja (28 km).

The months with the highest rainfall are December (114 mm) and November (109 mm), while the minimum in July (51 mm) and June (54 mm).

The relative air humidity is 76%. Relative humidity is higher in the months of December, November and
January, while it is lower in June and July. The difference between the highest and
the lowest humidity level is 19%.

The annual solar radiation lasts 1,968 hours. The month with the highest insolation is August with 298 hours and
July to 289 hours, while the month with the lowest insolation is December 58 and January 63 hours. The average annual solar radiation is 5 hours. Summer period (or periods of vegetation from IV–X) has an average of 1,411 hours of sunshine.

Biodiversity 
As a result of mild continental climate influenced by the mediterranean, the area is quite rich with species and associations. Besides the climatic elements in the richness of biodiversity in the area of Mirusha Park has influenced also the poor industrial development of this region. The park area is home to many endemic and stenoendemic species.

Flora 
In the territory of Mirusha are identified 330 species of vascular flora, without taking into account species of Mosses and Thallophyte. From Thallophyte are identified 44 species of high fungus (Macromycete) where in the wide area of Mirusha are identified 838 taxones, represented with 590 species of vascular flora. A specific of the Mirusha territory flora, is the presence of 14 plant associations, and 5 of them are to endemic character, whilst the total number of endemic species is 21. Among them the species Aristolochia merxmuelleri, which is a steno-endemic species and so far it is not found elsewhere in the world, except in Mirusha.

The largest part of the area is covered by the association of bungu (Ass. Querrcetum farnetto - cerris scardicum Krasniqi 1968), which is one of the most spread associations in Kosovo. A characteristic of this region is the presence of the habitats as: white willow (Salicetum albae fragilis), red willow (Salicetum purpurea), black alder (Alnetum glutinosae), oak (Quercetum farnetto cerris scardicum and Quercetum pubescentis‐cerris), juniper (Astero‐Juniperetum oxycedri), Polygala Genistetum hassertianae, Hyperico Euphorbietum glabliflorae, Potentilla-Fumaretum bonopartei, Salvio-Scorsoneretum villosae, Echinario-Convolvuletum althaeoides, Onosmo-Scabietosum fumaroides, Vitici-Tarmaricetum dalmaticae.

Fauna 

Regarding to the fauna, this area is very rich with particular kinds of animals, which are related to specific biotopes and belong to the endemic species. In Mirusha area are identified following animal species: boar (Sus scrofa), badger (Meles meles), rabbit (Lepus europaeus), squirrel (Scirius vulgaris), wolf (Canis lupus), wild cat (Felis silvestris), pine marten (Martes martes), maus (Ondatra zibethica), mountainous mous (Apodemus flaviocollis), hedgehog (Erinaceus concolor L.), terrestrial turtle (Testudo sp.), rocky poisonous snake (Vipera ammodytes) etc.

In the Mirusha river also exists good condition for amphibian and fish species.

Cultural heritage 

In Mirusha canyon itself are found caves as: the Great Church, the Small Church and caves in Spirits. The Great Church and Small Church caves are found in the cliffs of the canyon, in small dimensions and poor regarding their domestic regulation.
However, they represent very interesting objects because it is assumed that Orthodox monks sheltered there during the Ottoman occupation, and for this reason people called these caves "Churches".
In the Small Church cave were found remains of frescoes while in the Great Church cave were found traces of the altar of the prayers.

Among these caves the most interesting and most important is the Cave in Spirits. This cave has extraordinary dimensions and interesting interior, which should be investigated in particular by speleologists.

According to the law for classification of Special Protected Areas in Kosovo, the Church of the Hermits cave also represents an interesting and important monument. It is located in Uljaricë village, Klina municipality. Based on the list of monuments/cultural heritage objects with protection status in Kosovo, it is called Uluricë Cave (14th century).

Tourism 
Those waterfalls between the lakes, together with the landscape, rocks and caves around the waterfalls, form a special tourism attraction.

See also 
 Mirusha Waterfalls

Notes

References 

Parks in Kosovo